Belenići is a village in the municipality of Ravno, Bosnia and Herzegovina.In the 1991 census it had 12 inhabitants, all of them being Croats. Prior the war in Bosnia and Herzegovina it belonged to Trebinje municipality.

Demographics 
According to the 2013 census, its population was 137, all Croats.

References

Populated places in Ravno, Bosnia and Herzegovina